"Bailando Por El Mundo" is the single by Spanish producer, singer, remixer and DJ of electronic music Juan Magan, featuring vocals from American artist Pitbull, and Dominican artist El Cata. It was released as a digital download on October 4, 2011.The song was a hit in Spain and became a number one hit on the Billboard Hot Latin Songs chart. The track was nominated for Collaboration and Urban Song of the Year at the Premio Lo Nuestro 2013.

Track listing 
Digital download
 Bailando por el mundo – 3:15
 Bailando por el mundo (Explicit Version) – 3:15

Credits and personnel 
Lead vocals – Juan Magan, Pitbull and El Cata
Producers – Magan & Dj Buddha
Lyrics – Juan Magan, Armando Perez, Edward Bello
Label: Sony Music

Chart performance

Weekly charts

Year-end charts

Decade-end charts

Release history

See also 
List of number-one Billboard Top Latin Songs of 2012
 Pitbull Biography

References 

 

Songs about dancing
2011 singles
Pitbull (rapper) songs
Spanish-language songs
El Cata songs
Juan Magan songs
Songs written by Pitbull (rapper)
Songs written by Juan Magan
2011 songs
Sony Music singles
Songs written by DJ Buddha
Song recordings produced by DJ Buddha